Perlavia is a place in the parish of Trubia, in the municipality of Oviedo, Asturias, Spain. Perlavia is located about 15 km from Oviedo, the capital city of the Principality of Asturias.

Demographics

Oviedo